"Soldier of Love" is a 1988 song by American singer Donny Osmond, which became his comeback hit.  It first was a Top 30 hit in the UK in 1988 and "Soldier of Love" reached #2 on the Billboard Hot 100 in 1989, behind Michael Damian's "Rock On"

Background
The track was not initially released in the US as Osmond did not have a record deal there. However, a cassette of the song from a British import was sent by an Osmond fan to Jessica Ettinger, the acting Program Director and Music Director at ABC's WPLJ-FM New York. Ettinger liked the song but was concerned that Osmond, a former child star, wouldn't be accepted by the current pop audience.

Ettinger, believing the song to be a hit, up-ended the top 40 music and radio industry by giving it a slot on her playlist. Osmond was not only unsigned by any record label in the U.S., but the song itself was unavailable for purchase in the U.S. at the time. To give the song a chance, she created a "mystery artist" promotion; put the song in rotation, and kept listeners guessing who the artist was for several weeks. Eventually, Ettinger had her air talent reveal that the song was by Donny Osmond, who appeared live on the air at the same time. Osmond was soon signed by Capitol Records, which copied Ettinger's promotion idea nationwide and released the song as a single.  Osmond credits Ettinger with re-launching his career by listening to the music and not pre-judging whether a song could be a hit based on the name of the artist.

The song is set to a post-disco beat. Songwriters are Carl Sturken and Evan Rogers. The music video for the song was by John Scarlett Davis and produced by Nick Verden for Radar Films. Shot on location at London's Docklands.

Charts

Weekly charts

Year-end charts

References

Donny Osmond songs
1988 songs
1989 singles
Songs written by Carl Sturken and Evan Rogers
Music videos directed by Michael Bay
Capitol Records singles